The coat of arms of York is the official symbol of City of York Council, the local government of the City of York, England. The borough has been extended a number of times from the original city contained within the city walls. However, the arms have remained the same throughout all these changes to the borough.

Description
The shield, argent, bears St George's Cross upon which are five lions Passant Guardant. The variations depicting the Monarch's recognition of the City's powers of self-government are represented by a Civic Sword and Mace crossed behind the shield. The Chapeau (reversed from usual heraldic orientation - see Cap of maintenance) symbolises the office of Mayor who has the right to bear the Sword and Mace.

History

The use of St George's Cross shows the strong English influences and the former importance of the city of York when King Edward III made it the capital during the fighting against Scotland. The five lions represent acknowledgement of the City's strong support for the monarchy. It is thought that it was during the reign of Edward III that the coat of arms was first granted, although Francis Drake, in his history of the city, claims that the coat of arms is much older, originally consisting of only the cross of St George to which the five lions were added in the reign of William the Conqueror in recognition of the five magistrates who defended the city against him in 1070.

The crossed sword and mace with the cap of maintenance refer to the creation of the office of Lord Mayor of York in the 14th century by King Richard II. The king had presented a sword to the city in 1387 to be used in civic ceremonies and, in 1397, the right to also carry the mace was ensconced in a royal charter. The cap was presented to the city by King Richard II in 1393. These symbols have been in use since the 18th century.

The arms were recorded without tinctures (that is without colours) at the heraldic visitation of Yorkshire of 1584. When the Corporation of the City of York was abolished in 1974 and replaced by York City Council, the arms were transferred to the new authority. The arms were formally transferred to the present unitary authority by order in council in 1997.

A banner of the arms is flown as the city's flag.

References

York
Culture in York
History of York
York
York
York